Josef Weberbauer (born 13 March 1998) is an Austrian professional footballer who plays as a right-back for Ried.

Career
Weberbauer is a youth product of the academies of Kuchl and Red Bull Salzburg. He began his senior career with Anif in 2016, before moving to SAK 1914 in 2019. On 3 February 2020, he transferred to the 2. Liga club Grazer. He moved to Ried in the Austrian Football Bundesliga on 14 January 2022, signing a contract until 2024.

Playing style
Weberbauer is an energetic right-back who is known for his tireless runs up and down the pitch. Due to his stamina, his playstyle is compared to the Austrian international footballer Stefan Lainer.

References

External links
 
 OEFB Profile

1998 births
Living people
People from Hallein District
Austrian footballers
USK Anif players
Grazer AK players
SV Ried players
Austrian Football Bundesliga players
2. Liga (Austria) players
Austrian Regionalliga players
Association football fullbacks